Eugoa bipuncta is a moth of the family Erebidae first described by Franciscus J. M. Heylaerts in 1891. It is found in Sundaland and on Sulawesi and the Lesser Sunda Islands. The habitat consists of lowland forests.

References

bipuncta
Moths described in 1891